Hidden Valley is the ice-free valley next south of Miers Valley through which an alpine glacier formerly moved to coalesce with Koettlitz Glacier. The mouth of the valley is completely blocked by the Koettlitz moraine, the only one of the numerous valleys tributary to the Koettlitz isolated in this fashion. The main valley is hidden not only from the coast but from most of the surrounding ridges. The valley was traversed during December and January by the New Zealand Victoria University of Wellington Antarctic Expedition (VUWAE) 1960-61 who applied the name.

Mirabilite Pond is an alkali pond at a high elevation in the southern part Hidden Valley, west of Koettlitz Glacier. The pond is located on the northern side of the ridge that bounds the southeast part of Hidden Valley. The feature was studied by U.S. geologist Troy L. Pewe in 1957–58 whose finding of a thin film of the white salt mirabilite (Glauber's salt) around the edge of the pond suggested the name.

References

Valleys of Antarctica